Chuquiraga jussieui, the flower of the Andes, is a species of flowering plant in the family Asteraceae. It is a low shrub, reaching a height of about 75 cm. Chuquiraga jussieui is an endangered flower. Flowers are pale yellow or orange. It is native to Ecuador and Peru, and grows at 3000 to 5000 meters above sea level. Additionally, it contains bioactive components with medicinal properties. The hummingbirds Oreotrochilus chimborazo feed on the nectar.

References

Barnadesioideae
Flora of Ecuador
Flora of Peru
Endangered flora of South America
Plants described in 1792
Taxa named by Johann Friedrich Gmelin
Taxa named by Aimé Bonpland